Nessaea batesii, the Bates olivewing, is a species of butterfly of the family Nymphalidae. It is found in eastern Venezuela, the Guianas and the lower Amazon in Brazil.

The length of the wings is 29–36 mm for males and 32–40 mm for females. The upperside of adult males is dark brown, with bright sky-blue diagonal bands on the forewings and orange patches on the hindwings. The females have plain brown hindwings, blue diagonal bands across the forewings, and elongated reddish spots within the discal cell of the forewings.

Subspecies
Nessaea batesii batesii (Brazil (Pará))
Nessaea batesii magniplaga Röber, 1928 (Suriname)

References

Biblidinae
Fauna of Brazil
Nymphalidae of South America
Butterflies described in 1860
Taxa named by Baron Cajetan von Felder
Taxa named by Rudolf Felder